The 2005–06 National Football League, also known as the ONGC National Football League for sponsorship reasons, was the tenth season of the National Football League, the top Indian professional league for association football clubs, since its inception in 1996. It started on 10 January 2006 and concluded on 21 May.

East Bengal's Bhaichung Bhutia was named the best player of the league.

Overview
It was contested by 10 teams, and Mahindra United won the championship under the coach Derrick Pereira and this was their first title. East Bengal came second while Mohun Bagan came as third. Fransa Pax and Salgaocar were relegated from the National Football League 2006-07.

League standings

Season statistics

Top scorers

Hat-tricks

Note: (H) – Home; (A) – Away

Season awards 
The following awards were given at the conclusion of the season. Mohun Bagan's Bhaichung Bhutia was voted the best player of the season by the coaches and captains of all participating teams of the season. JCT Mills received the fairplay award for receiving the lowest number of cards (8).

References

External links 
 League home at Rediff.com
 10th National Football League at Rec.Sport.Soccer Statistics Foundation

National Football League (India) seasons
2005–06 in Indian football leagues
India